The Institute of Children's Literature is an institute founded in 1969 that offers a course titled "Writing for Children and Teenagers," among many others. Completing the course is worth six college credits, which can be obtained from Charter Oak State College. Courses are also available for writers who want to author short stories and articles.

The institute is located in West Redding, Connecticut.

The Institute's instruction is strictly by correspondence. Each student is assigned to a professional instructor, who reads and critiques each writing assignment. Students learn by completing assignments of their choice in fiction and non-fiction genres. Editors have wide experience as published writers in the children's market. The written critiques are customized for the student's particular work and are not just form letters or "how to" replies.

The institute also includes some training in how to market manuscripts. Naturally, no course, including this one, guarantees success or publication and the institute does not make such a representation.

The student who will most benefit from a course at the Institute of Children's Literature is probably one who: has a general grasp of grammar and basic writing technique, is self-motivated, willing to work, and has time to dedicate - both to the course and then to seeking out markets for their material.

The Institute of Children's Literature does not market manuscripts or represent the writer to any publisher or literary agent.

The Institute is accepting new students as of summer 2015.

Educational institutions established in 1969
1969 establishments in Connecticut